Metodija Andonov-Čento (17 August 1902 – 24 July 1957) was a Macedonian statesman, the first president of the Anti-Fascist Assembly of the National Liberation of Macedonia and of the People's Republic of Macedonia in the Federal People's Republic of Yugoslavia after the Second World War. In Bulgaria he is often considered a Bulgarian.

Biography

Early life 
Metodi Andonov was born in Prilep, which was then part of the Manastir Vilayet of the Ottoman Empire. His father was from Pletvar, while his mother was from Lenište. After the Balkan Wars in 1913 the area was ceded to Serbia. During the World War I Bulgarian occupation the authorities consisted of local activists and thus were popular enough there. After the war the area was ceded to the new Kingdom of Serbs, Croats and Slovenes (later Yugoslavia). As a child, he worked in opium poppy fields and harvested tobacco. During his adolescence, he was considered to be an excellent gymnast. He graduated from trade school in Prilep and in 1926 he opened a grocery store and provided himself with a decent living. On March 25, 1930, in Novi Sad, he entered into a civil marriage with Vasilka Spirova Pop-Atanasova. In the interwar period the young local intelligentsia attempted at a separate Macedonian way of national development, as a reaction of the controversial domestic policy of serbianization. Čento underwent such a transformation from pro-Bulgarian to an ethnic Macedonian.

In 1926 he opened a shop and was engaged in retail trade and politics. On 25 March 1930 he married Vasilka Spirova Pop Atanasova in Novi Sad and fathered four children. At that time Čento headed a group of young Macedonian nationalists, who took up decidedly an anti-Serbian position. In fact the politicians in Belgrade actually helped to strengthen the developing Macedonian identity by promoting forcible Serbianization. He was a sympathizer of Vladko Macek's idea on the creation of a separate Banovina of Croatia and after its realization in 1939 proclaimed the thesis on the foundation of a separate Banovina of Macedonia. At the 1938 Yugoslav elections, he was elected deputy from the Croatian Peasant Party, but didn't become a Member of Parliament because of a manipulation with the electoral system. In 1939, he was imprisoned at Velika Kikinda for co-organizing the anti-Serbian Ilinden Demonstrations in Prilep. The following year, he imposed the use of the Macedonian language in school lectures and was therefore imprisoned at Bajina Bašta and sentenced to death by the government of the Kingdom of Yugoslavia for advocating the use of a language other than Serbo-Croatian. On 15 April 1941 he was presented to a firing squad, but was pardoned just prior to being shot, due to the public pressure on the background of the Blitzkrieg conducted by the Axis Powers during their invasion of Yugoslavia.

During World War II 

After the capitulation of Yugoslavia, Čento was set free from prison and came in contact with the right-wing Internal Macedonian Revolutionary Organization (IMRO) activists and pro-Bulgarian political forces. The Macedonian communists also fell in the sphere of influence of the Bulgarian Communist Party under Metodi Shatorov's leadership, with whom Čento was also in close contact. Although he received at that time an invitation to collaborate with the new Bulgarian authorities Čento refused, considering that idea unpromising and insisting on independence. In 1942 Čento began to sympathize with the resistance and his store was used as a front for the Macedonian Partisans, which prompted Bulgarian authorities to arrest him. By the end of 1942 he was interned in the inland of the country and later sent to a labor camp.

Upon his release in the fall of 1943, Čento met Kuzman Josifovski, a member of the General Staff of the Partisan units of Macedonia, who convinced him to join them. As result Čento went to the German occupation zone of Vardar Macedonia, then part of Albania, where he became a member of the General Staff of the resistance. In December 1943, Čento was elected chairman of the Initiative committee for the organization of the Antifascist Assembly of the National Liberation of Macedonia (ASNOM). In June, Čento along with Emanuel Čučkov and Kiril Petrušev met with Josip Broz Tito on the island of Vis for consultations due to their activity. The meeting was held on June 24, with the Macedonian delegation raising the issue of United Macedonia after the German retreat. In August 1944, he was elected as President of Anti-Fascist Assembly of the National Liberation of Macedonia. At his initiative, at its first meeting were invited former IMRO activists, related to the Bulgarian Action Committees, who he wanted to associate to the administration of the future state. 

Čento's goal was to create a fully independent United Macedonian state, but after by mid-November 1944 the Partisans had established military and administrative control of the region, it became clear that Macedonia should be constituent republic within the new SFR Yugoslavia. Čento saw this as a second period of Serbian dominance in Macedonia and insisted on independence for the republic from the federal Yugoslav authorities. In this way, he clashed with Svetozar Vukmanović-Tempo, Josip Broz Tito's envoy to Macedonia and Lazar Koliševski, the leader of the ruling Communist Party of Macedonia.

After World War II 

The new communist authorities started a policy fully implementing the pro-Yugoslav line and took hard measures against the opposition. Čento publicly condemned the killings carried out by the authorities in parliament and sent a protest to the Macedonian Supreme Court. He supported the Skopje soldiers' rebellion when officers from the Gotse Delchev Brigade, mutinied in the garrison stationed in Skopje Fortress, but were suppressed by an armed intervention. Čento opposed the sending of Macedonian Partisans to the Syrmian Front. Čento wanted to send it to Thessaloniki, then abandoned by the Germans, for the purpose of creating a United Macedonia. He also opposed the planned return of Serbian colonists, expelled by the Bulgarians. By the voting of Art. 1 of the new constitution of the SFRY, which lacked the ability of the constituent republics to leave the federation, he defiantly left the parliament in Belgrade. After disagreements with the policies of the new authorities, Čento resigned.

In 1946, he went back to Prilep, where he established contacts with illegal anti-Yugoslav group, with ideas close to these of the banned Internal Macedonian Revolutionary Organization, which insisted on Independent Macedonia. Čento openly called for Macedonia to secede from Yugoslavia and  decided to go incognito at the Paris Peace Conference and to advocate for Macedonia's independence. He was arrested in the summer of 1946, after being caught reportedly crossing illegal the border with Greece in order to visit Paris. In November 1946 Čento was brought before the Macedonian tribunal. The  court included high ranking communist-politicians as Lazar Mojsov and Kole Čašule. The fabricated charges against him were of being a Western spy, working against the SR Macedonia as part of SFR Yugoslavia, and  being in contact with IMRO terrorist, who supported a pro-Bulgarian Independent Macedonia as envisaged by Ivan Mihailov. He was sentenced to eleven years in prison under forced labor. He spent more than 9 years in the Idrizovo prison, but as a result of the conditions there, Čento became seriously ill and was released before the end of his sentence. In his hometown, he worked digging holes for telegraph poles to save his four children from starvation. He died at home on 24 July 1957 after sickness from torture in prison. Thus, in communist Yugoslavia, his name became taboo, and when mentioned, he was described as a traitor and counter-revolutionary.

Legacy

Metodija Andonov-Čento was rehabilitated in 1991 with a decision of the Supreme Court of the newly proclaimed Republic of Macedonia in which it annulled the verdict against Čento from 1946. In 1992, his family and followers established a Čento Foundation, which initiated a lawsuit for damages against the Government of Macedonia. Before Čento was rehabilitated in 1991 in Macedonia he was often described by the Bulgarian communist historiography as a Bulgarian, and up to this time is considered as such by some historians. A similar view has been expressed by Hough Poulton and therefore criticized by Victor Friedman, though this view still exists in the specialized literature.

See also
President of the Republic of Macedonia

References

External links
 Biography on Metodija Andonov-Čento
Andonov Goran

1902 births
1957 deaths
People from Prilep
People from Manastir vilayet
Yugoslav Partisans members
Macedonian politicians
Macedonian people of Bulgarian descent
Socialist Republic of Macedonia